Amy Butler may refer to:

 Amy Butler (camogie player) (born 1987), camogie player and accountant
 Amy Butler (designer), American fabric and pattern designer
Amy Butler (minister), mainline Protestant minister